The 2014 Patriot League men's basketball tournament was held March 3, 5, 8 and 12 at campus sites of the higher seed.  The winner of the tournament received an automatic bid to the NCAA tournament.

Seeds
Teams were seeded by conference record, with a ties broken by record between the tied teams followed by record against the regular-season champion, if necessary.

Schedule

Bracket

References

External links
 2014 Patriot League Men's Basketball Championship 

Patriot League men's basketball tournament
Tournament
Patriot League men's basketball tournament